The 1906 Meishan earthquake was centered on Moe'akhe, Kagi-cho, Japanese Taiwan (modern-day Meishan, Chiayi County, Taiwan) and occurred on March 17. Referred to at the time as the Great Kagi earthquake, it is the third-deadliest earthquake in Taiwan's recorded history, claiming around 1,260 lives. The shock had a surface wave magnitude of 6.8 and a Mercalli intensity of IX (Violent).

Earthquake
The earthquake struck at 06:43 local time on 17 March 1906, at a focal depth of 6 kilometres (3.7 mi). The event created the Meishan fault, a fault with a length of 25 kilometres (15.5 mi) stretching through modern-day Chiayi County. Aftershocks continued throughout the day, hampering rescue efforts.

Damage
Reports vary slightly, but according to the official Central Weather Bureau summary, the casualties and damage were as follows:
Deaths: 1,258
Injuries: 2,385
Houses destroyed: 6,769
Houses damaged: 14,218

Fusakichi Omori, a pioneering seismologist from Japan who arrived shortly after the earthquake believed that the high number of casualties was due to the construction of the local houses. Loosely cemented with mud, the combination of sun-dried mud brick walls and heavy roofing beams was thought to be responsible for many dwellings collapsing, killing or injuring the inhabitants. He also found evidence of soil liquefaction, and stated that the town of Bishō (Meishan) had been completely destroyed by the quake.

Omori's figures give slightly different casualty rates, and very different statistics for building damage:
Deaths: 1,266
Injuries: 2,476
Houses destroyed: 7,284
Houses damaged: 30,021

Reaction
The veteran missionary William Campbell wrote:

The Japanese colonial authorities in Taihoku (Taipei) sent teams of medical personnel to assist, and Campbell reported that shortly after the earthquake reconstruction efforts were well advanced. At the time some writers suggested a link between the Meishan quake and the great 1906 San Francisco earthquake, which occurred a month later, while some religious groups linked it not only with the San Francisco disaster, but also an earlier earthquake in Cambria, Italy and other natural disasters as a sign of the end-times.

See also
List of earthquakes in 1906
List of earthquakes in Taiwan

References

External links

Meishan Earthquake, 1906
Meishan
March 1906 events
Chiayi County
Earthquakes in Taiwan